Gibraltar has competed in the European Championships since the inaugural event in 2018.

Medal count

See also
Gibraltar at the Commonwealth Games
Sport in Gibraltar

References

Gibraltar at multi-sport events
National sports teams of Gibraltar